Krishnarjuna is a 2008 Indian fantasy comedy film produced by M.Mohan Babu on his Sri Lakshmi Prasanna Pictures banner and directed by P. Vasu. Starring Nagarjuna Akkineni, Manchu Vishnu and Mamta Mohandas. The music composed by M. M. Keeravani. In the film, when Baba, an astrologer claims that Satya's first husband will be killed, her brother Pedababu plans to get her married to the ill-treated orphan Arjun. However, Lord Krishna comes to Arjun's assistance and rescue. 

The film was a box office failure.

Plot
A mentally unstable pregnant woman runs inside a temple and closes the door. She gives birth to a boy at the feet of Lord Krishna's idol and breathes her last. The doors of the temple are closed, as people believe that the birth of such a woman's child in 'Gharbhagudi' is a bad omen. The boy, named Arjun (Manchu Vishnu), grows up under the guardianship of his grandmother (Manorama). He goes to work as a bodyguard to Satya (Mamta Mohandas), the sister of landlord Pedababu (Nassar). Arjun and his grandmother live in the outhouse of Pedababu's bungalow. Arjun is ill-treated by everyone. When an astrologer says that Satya's first husband will be killed and she will live happily with her second husband, Pedababu plans to get Satya married to Arjun first. Then, he conspires to kill him and get Satya married to a rich man. However, Lord Krishna (Nagarjuna Akkineni) comes to Arjun's assistance. Arjun gains some powers from his companionship with the Lord and overcomes the evils that threaten his peace and family life. He also succeeds in reopening the doors of the temple. Arjun then dies by jumping off a tall building because of his faith in Lord Krishna who revives him a minute after his death. The film ends on a happy note.

Cast

 Nagarjuna Akkineni as Lord Krishna / Bangaram
 Manchu Vishnu as Arjun
 Mamta Mohandas as Sathya
 Mohan Babu as Baba
 Nassar as Pedababu
 Napoleon as Nallama Nayakkar
 Brahmanandam as Jyotish Brahmanandam Parmanandgaru
 Sunil as Arjun's sidekick
 Manorama as Arjun's grandmother
 Venu Madhav as Businessman
 Dev Gill
 P. Vasu
 Vamsi Krishna
 Mallikarjuna Rao 
 Gundu Hanumantha Rao 
 Tanikella Bharani
 Prema 
 Bhuvaneswari
 Surekha Vani 
 Srinivasa Reddy  
 Giri Babu 
 Raghu Babu
 M. S. Narayana
 Satyam Rajesh
 Uttej 
 Suthi Velu
 Lakshmipathi 
 Ananth
 Kadambari Kiran
 Apoorva 
 Poornima 
 Srilalita 
 Gayatri 
 Master Akshay  
 Baby Greeshma

Music

The music was composed by M. M. Keeravani. Music was released on 24 Frames Music Company.

Release
In 2016, the producers dubbed and released the film into the Tamil language as Rowdy Maappillai and dubbed into Hindi language as "Rowdy Krishna" by Wide Angel Media(WAM).

References

External links
 

2008 films
Indian fantasy films
Films directed by P. Vasu
Films scored by M. M. Keeravani
2000s Telugu-language films
Indian pregnancy films
Films shot in Dubai
Indian films with live action and animation
2008 fantasy films